"Wish You Were Here" is a song by Swedish band Rednex from their first album, Sex & Violins (1995). Written by Teijo Agélii-Leskelä and produced by Denniz Pop and Max Martin, the ballad is performed by lead singer Annika Ljungberg and was released as the third single of the album in April 1995. It became a number-one hit in Austria, Germany, Norway, and Switzerland. In Austria, it was the most successful single of 1995. Additionally, the song reached number two in Iceland, number three in Sweden, and number six in Finland. On the Eurochart Hot 100, it peaked at number five.

Critical reception
American magazine Billboard complimented "Wish You Were Here" as a "surprisingly sincere ballad". J.D. Considine from The Daily Gazette described it as a "unexpectedly ABBA-esque" and "melancholy ballad". Chuck Campbell from Knoxville News Sentinel called it a "leaden ballad". Howard Cohen for The Miami Herald viewed it as one of "a few melodramatic instances" on the Sex & Violins album. Pan-European magazine Music & Media remarked that it focuses on a totally different side by the band, adding, "It's a ballad, sung with lots of Dolly-patented vibrato and pathos." David Nagy from Red Deer Advocate wrote, "Just when the hillbilly party gets going, the band throws a contemporary pop ballad at you, and thoughts of ABBA come to mind."

Chart performance
"Wish You Were Here" made an impact on the charts in Europe, becoming a successful hit in several countries. The song went to number-one in Austria, Germany, Norway and Switzerland. It entered the top 5 also in Iceland (2) and Sweden (3), as well as on the Eurochart Hot 100, where it peaked at number five in July 1995. Additionally, "Wish You Were Here" was a top 10 hit in Denmark (10) and Finland (6), and a top 30 hit in Belgium (24) and the Netherlands (26). In Austria, it was the most successful single of 1995, while in both Germany and Switzerland, it was the third most successful single of 1995.

The song was awarded with a gold record in Austria and Switzerland, with a sale of 25,000, and a platinum record in Germany and Norway, where the single sold 500,000 (in Germany).

Music video
The accompanying music video for "Wish You Were Here" was directed by Matt Broadley. It shows a woman, played by lead singer Annika Ljungberg, sitting in a meadow, singing to her man, a soldier who has been killed in a war. Other times we see the male band members dressed like soldiers, on a battlefield. They are shooting at each other and some of them being shot. In between, romantic flashbacks between the woman and the man takes us back to happier days. In the end, the woman walks through the battlefield at night with a torch in her hand. She watches and sings to the dead soldiers, lying on the ground. The video has a sepia tone. It was later published on Rednex' official YouTube channel in 2013, and had generated more than 13 million views as of February 2023.

Track listings

 7-inch single, Germany
 "Wish You Were Here" (radio edit) — 4:00
 "Wish You Were Here" (Live at Brunkeflo Town Hall) — 4:08

 12-inch maxi-single, Germany
 "Wish You Were Here" (Stampede Remix) — 5:57
 "Wish You Were Here" (radio edit) — 4:00
 "Wish You Were Here" (Live at Brunkeflo Town Hall) — 4:08
 "Hittin' the Hay" — 3:19

 CD single, Europe "Wish You Were Here" (radio edit) — 3:56
 "Hittin' the Hay" — 3:18

 CD maxi, Europe' "Wish You Were Here" (radio edit) — 3:56
 "Wish You Were Here" (Live at Brunkeflo Town Hall) — 3:57
 "Hittin' the Hay" — 3:18
 "Wish You Were Here" (Stampede Remix) — 6:05

Charts

Weekly charts

Year-end charts

Certifications

Cover versions
 Urgent C in 1995 
 Blackmore's Night on album, Shadow of the Moon (1997)
 In 2006, the song was covered by former Deutschland sucht den SuperStar contestant Anna-Maria Zimmermann on the Love Songs'' album.

References

Rednex songs
1990s ballads
1994 songs
1995 singles
Music videos directed by Matt Broadley
Number-one singles in Austria
Number-one singles in Germany
Number-one singles in Norway
Number-one singles in Switzerland
Pop ballads
Song recordings produced by Max Martin
Song recordings produced by Denniz Pop
Songs written by Max Martin
Songs written by Denniz Pop
ZYX Music singles